HD 199223 (HR 8010) is a double star in the equatorial constellation Delphinus. However, the system was originally in Equuleus prior to the creation of official IAU constellation borders. They have apparent magnitudes of 6.34 and 7.49 and distances of 354 and 359 light years respectively.

The brighter component has a stellar classification of G8 III/IV, indicating that it is a G-type star with the blended luminosity class of a giant star and a subgiant.

As for the dimmer one, it is classified as an F/G star, and is calculated to be an F-type subgiant. It has 146% of the mass of the Sun and 2.1 times its radius.

References

Delphinus (constellation)
199223
103301
8010
G-type subgiants
G-type giants
BD+03 4461
Equulei, 1
Double stars
F-type subgiants